The Lucas Museum of Narrative Art  is a museum founded by filmmaker George Lucas and his wife, businesswoman Mellody Hobson. Once completed, the museum will hold all forms of visual storytelling, including painting, photography, sculpture, illustration, comic art, performance, and video. It is under construction in Exposition Park in Los Angeles, California. The museum is expected to open in 2025.

Collections
The Lucas Museum will house works by artists such as Judith F. Baca, N.C. Wyeth, Carrie Mae Weems, Diego Rivera, Norman Rockwell, Frank Frazetta, Ralph McQuarrie, Jacob Lawrence, Kadir Nelson, Paul Cadmus, Yinka Shonibare, and Jack Kirby. In 2021, the museum announced the acquisition of the archive of materials related to the development and execution of Judith F. Baca's half-mile-long mural The History of California, popularly known as The Great Wall of Los Angeles, located in the San Fernando Valley.  Also in 2021, the museum acquired Robert Colescott's painting George Washington Carver Crossing the Delaware River: Page from an American History Textbook, a work the director and CEO Sandra Jason-Dumont says "bridges popular culture and history. It's a wonderful opportunity for us to make sure the Lucas Museum is participating in expanding canon."

In 2019, the museum acquired the Separate Cinema Archive, which includes posters, lobby cards, film stills, scripts, and other artifacts that track the history of African American cinema from 1904 to contemporary era. In total, the archive contains about 37,000 objects. Dorothy Dandridge, Paul Robeson, Duke Ellington, Sidney Poitier, and Josephine Baker are among the stars whose work is documented in the collection. A statement by museum CEO Sandra Jackson-Dumont said "The Separate Cinema Archive will not only provide film scholars with incredible opportunities for research, this treasure trove will also catalyze important conversations about the inspiring narratives of African American perspectives represented through film.”

History
The first president of the museum was Don Bacigalupi, former president of Crystal Bridges Museum of American Art in Bentonville, Arkansas. He stepped down from this role in early 2019. In October 2019, Sandra Jackson-Dumont was announced as director and CEO.

Proposed San Francisco site

To be known as the Lucas Cultural Arts Museum, it was originally planned for San Francisco, on Crissy Field. This version of the museum would have held Lucas's art collection, which is estimated to be worth approximately $1 billion. After four years of unsuccessful negotiations with The Presidio Trust over the land in San Francisco, Lucas announced that Chicago would host the museum instead, due in interest from the city's mayor, Rahm Emanuel, and the promise of land on the shore of Lake Michigan. The museum would lease the land from the Chicago Park District for $1 a year. Los Angeles mayor Eric Garcetti also made a bid to host the project, offering Lucas land in Exposition Park adjacent to the University of Southern California. Lucas, however, looked to Chicago as the location to build his museum. Youngstown Mayor John McNally had also proposed to Lucas to locate the museum in Youngstown, Ohio, offering donated land in the city's downtown.

Proposed Chicago site

In Chicago, the proposed site on a parking lot near Soldier Field, Burnham Harbor, and the Museum Campus was chosen by a Chicago city commission.  After the formal announcement of the museum's location on Chicago's lake shore and the later unveiling of its architecture, the project faced opposition as it had in San Francisco. In an editorial, the Chicago Tribune condemned the size of the structure, referring to it as "a monument to its patron rather than a modest addition to a democratic public space". The Chicago plan called for a museum building roughly four times the size of the one that had been planned in San Francisco, though that size was later scaled back. The Tribune also expressed worries about the cost of maintenance, to be absorbed by taxpayers, and the damage to the preservation of the lakefront.

Friends of the Parks, a Chicago-area preservation organization, opposed the plan, citing a ban on development on the land proposed for the Lucas Museum. It filed a federal suit to block the development, arguing that granting the museum a 99-year lease "effectively surrenders control" of prime lakefront property to a museum that is "not for the benefit of the public" but would "promote private and/or commercial interests". In March 2015, U.S. District Judge John Darrah ruled the land intended for the museum is held in public trust. Thus, the Illinois General Assembly is the only body with the power to amend the law and allow construction to proceed.  The state subsequently approved a law designed to enable such projects, and the Chicago City Council approved zoning. while the Chicago Park District approved a long-term lease and litigation ensued.

MAD architects, headed by Ma Yansong, was responsible for designing a  building for the Chicago site, while VOA Associates was designated to oversee construction. Studio Gang Architects, already involved in the rehabilitation of Northerly Island, was selected to design the landscape. The design was met with some criticism upon release. Blair Kamin of the Chicago Tribune called the structure "needlessly massive" and called for a "dose of restraint" to preserve the lakefront. In Crain's Chicago Business, Greg Hinz derided it as "[yelling] and [carrying] on, in its own way defacing the city's lakefront as much as any teenager with a can of spray paint...". Revised plans were released in September 2015, which scaled back on the size of the project but otherwise kept the basic design.

Criticism also has been leveled against Friends of the Parks for its opposition to the project; a project that would have converted a stadium parking lot to a cultural attraction along with additional parkland, and also directly and indirectly provide millions of dollars annually to the host city. In May 2016, Bill Kurtis wrote an op-ed in support of the Lucas Museum which appeared in the Chicago Tribune.

On May 3, 2016, a statement released by Mellody Hobson, wife of George Lucas, stated that the couple was seeking other cities to host the museum after a protracted confrontation with Friends of the Parks.  On June 24, 2016, Lucas announced that the museum would not be located in Chicago.

Los Angeles site
After unsuccessful negotiations in San Francisco and Chicago, in June 2016 museum officials announced that they were considering Los Angeles. George Lucas announced on January 10, 2017, that the museum would be built in Exposition Park in Los Angeles, California, citing the proximity of University of Southern California, his alma mater, the Los Angeles Memorial Coliseum,  Banc of California Stadium, other museums, and local schools in the South Los Angeles region.

The building was designed by Ma Yansong of Chinese architecture firm MAD Architects (MAD Studio) and architect of record Stantec. The museum's nearly 300,000 square-foot building will be five levels and include 100,000 square-feet  of dedicated gallery space, a library, dedicated learning studios, two theaters, a restaurant, a café, and an event space, and will sit on 11 acres of new park space designed by landscape architecture firm Studio-MLA.

Construction
Construction prep began in January 2018. Hathaway Dinwiddie is the general contractor. The groundbreaking ceremony took place on March 14, 2018. The museum was originally set to open in 2021, but the opening was pushed to 2023 due to delays associated with the COVID-19 pandemic. In 2022, the opening was pushed again, to 2025.

References

External links

George Lucas
Media museums in California
Museums of American art
Planned new art museums and galleries
Proposed buildings and structures in California
Proposed museums in the United States
Exposition Park (Los Angeles)
South Los Angeles
Buildings and structures under construction in the United States